The Renault Clio Rally4 is a rally car developed and built by Renault Sport for the Rally Pyramid regulation of the Rally4 category. It is based upon the Renault Clio road car and used by the crews competing the European Rally Championship-3.

Development
The Renault Clio Rally4 weighs  and features a five-speed sequential gearbox and a turbocharged  four-cylinder engine, which is more powerful than that in the Rally5 variant. It features adjustable shock absorbers, using slightly wider tyres at tarmac events than the Rally5 car. The Rally4 car is largely based upon the Rally5 version in most aspects, which itself is derived from the standard road-going R.S. Line model of the mark five Clio.

Competition history
The car made its debut at the Targa Florio – Rally Internazionale di Sicilia, driven by Paolo Andreucci.

Rally victories

Regional championships

European Rally Championship-3

References

External links

  
 Renault Clio Rally4 at eWRC-results.com

Clio Rally4
Rally4 cars